Proske is a German and North American last name which is either derived from the first name of Greek origin Ambrose or from a diminutive of any of several Slavic personal names with the first component Prosi- (from Proto-Slavic *prositi "to ask"), e.g. Prosimir or Prosislaw.
Notable people with the surname include:
 Beatrice Gilman Proske  (1899–2002), American art historian
 Jenn Proske (born 1987), Canadian American actress
 Karl Proske (1794–1861), German Catholic cleric
 Oliver Proske (born 1971), German stage designer
 Uwe Proske (born 1961), German fencer

References

German-language surnames